Turn You to Love is a studio album from American musician Terry Callier. Released by Elektra Records in 1979, this is the artist's sixth album and the second with Elektra. It has received mixed critical reception.

Critical reception
Writing for Pitchfork Media, Andy Beta scored this album and 1978's Fire on Ice a 5.5 out of 10, with praise for Callier's vocals on this recording proving that "he could've been a distinct R&B personality had the breaks gone his way". The editorial staff of AllMusic Guide scored this album four out of five stars, with reviewer Thom Jurek declaring it "easily Terry Callier's most underrated album" after the "miss" that was Fire on Ice.

Track listing
"Sign of the Times" (Terry Callier and Larry Wade) – 8:25
"Pyramids of Love" (Wade) – 3:42
"Turn You to Love" (Callier and Wade) – 3:46
"Do It Again" (Walter Becker and Donald Fagen) – 4:52
"Ordinary Joe" (Callier) – 4:54
"Occasional Rain" (Callier) – 3:49
"Still Water (Love)" (Smokey Robinson and Frank Wilson) – 3:48
"You and Me (Will Always Be in Love)" (Callier and Wade) – 4:21
"A Mother's Love" (Callier, Earl Johnson, and Wade) – 3:44

Personnel
Terry Callier – guitar, vocals

Additional musicians
Michael Boddicker – synthesizer
Oscar Brashear – trumpet
Oliver C. Brown, Jr. – percussion
Keni Burke – bass guitar on all tracks, except "Ordinary Joe"
Reginald “Sonny” Burke – keyboards, synthesizer, arrangement, conducting, production
James Gadson – membraphone
William Green – saxophone
Elizabeth Howard – backing vocals
James Jamerson – bass guitar on "Ordinary Joe"
Barbara Korn – French horn
Gayle Levant – harp
Steve Madaio – trumpet
Arthur Maebe – French horn
James "Alibe" Sledge – backing vocals
Patricia Henley Talbert – backing vocals
Tommy Tedesco – guitar, mandolin
Earl Van Dyke – keyboards
Larry Wade – guitar
David T. Walker – guitar
Melvin “Wah Wah” Watson – guitar
Ernie Watts – saxophone
Fred Wesley – trombone
Robert White – guitar

Technical personnel
Samuel F. Brown III – orchestration
Ron Coro – art direction
Roger Dollarhide – engineering
Mary Francis – design, illustration
Laura Livingston – engineering
Sye Mitchell – engineering
Don Mizell – executive production
Jimmy Schifflett – engineering

References

External links

1979 albums
Elektra Records albums
Terry Callier albums